Oberea quadricallosa is a species of beetle in the family Cerambycidae. It was described by John Lawrence LeConte in 1874. It is known from British Columbia, Canada; and the United States.

References

Beetles described in 1874
quadricallosa